Plešivec is a settlement in the Municipality of Velenje in northern Slovenia. It lies in the Mozirje Hills north of Velenje. The area is part of the traditional region of Styria. The entire municipality is now included in the Savinja Statistical Region.

The local church is dedicated to Saint Nicholas and belongs to the Parish of Velenje Saint Martin. It was first mentioned in written documents dating to 1328. The current building is Baroque from the 17th century.

References

External links

Plešivec at Geopedia
Plešivec transmitting site

Populated places in the City Municipality of Velenje
Transmitter sites in Slovenia